Los ladrones van a la oficina (The thieves go to the office) is a Spanish comedy television show, broadcast between 1993 and 1996 on Antena 3. Starring José Luis López Vázquez, Fernando Fernán Gómez, Manuel Alexandre, Agustín González, Anabel Alonso and Antonio Resines, the series won an Onda award in 1993.

Plot 
The series takes place in a bar called "La Oficina" (The Office), which is at number 12 on a Madrid street called "San Esteban de Pravia"  (named the same as the town where the director was born). The bar is run by "Pruden" (Anabel Alonso) and her husband, "Smith" (Antonio Resines). A group of thieves, headed up by "Don Anselmo" (Fernando Fernán Gómez), and the veterans "Escabeche" (José Luis López Vázquez) and "Anticuario" (Manuel Alexandre), regularly meet there. The three friends, who reminisce over cons and plan new ones, are closely watched by the clumsy but good-natured "Comisario García" (Agustín González) and his assistant, "Inspector Gutiérrez" (Roberto Cairo).

Cast 

 José Luis López Vázquez – Antonio Pedraza Sánchez, "Escabeche"
 Fernando Fernán Gómez – Don Anselmo Prieto Díaz
 Anabel Alonso – Prudencia Prieto Romerales,  "Pruden"
 Antonio Resines – Emilio Gómez Saénz, "Smith"
 Guillermo Montesinos – Casimiro Durán, "Durán"
 Manuel Alexandre – Arsenio Vázquez Izquierdo, "Anticuario"
 Mabel Lozano – Remedios Gutiérrez Engracia, "Reme"
 Agustín González – Manuel García García, "Comisario García"
 Roberto Cairo – Inspector Eusebio Gutiérrez
 Mary Carmen Ramírez – Lucila
 Rossy de Palma – Eva Duarte

Awards and nominations 

 Onda awards

References 

1993 Spanish television series debuts
Antena 3 (Spanish TV channel) network series
1990s Spanish comedy television series
1996 Spanish television series endings
Spanish television sitcoms
Television shows set in Madrid
Spanish crime comedy television series